Rock 'n' Roll Adult is a live album by Garland Jeffreys.  It was recorded live in Lyon France and at The Ritz in New York City.  It was released in 1981 by Epic Records.

Track listing
All tracks composed by Garland Jeffreys; except where indicated
 "Wild in the Streets" - 3:20
 "96 Tears" (Rudy Martinez) - 3:21
 "I May Not Be Your Kind" - 5:56
 "Matador" - 4:22
 "R.O.C.K." - 3:59
 "35 Millimeter Dreams" - 4:07
 "Bound to Get Ahead Someday" - 3:58
 "Cool Down Boy" - 12:45

Personnel 
Garland Jeffreys - vocals, guitar, percussion, cover concept
Martin Belmont -guitar, backing vocals
Andrew Bodnar - bass
Arti Funaro - keyboards, guitar, backing vocals
Steve Goulding - drums
Brinsley Schwarz - guitar, backing vocals
Brian Stanley - bass
Technical
Barry Ainsworth, Barry Bongiovi, David Brown, David Hewitt, Kooster McAllister, Michael Ewasko - engineer

External links 
AMG review

1981 live albums
Garland Jeffreys albums
albums produced by Bob Clearmountain
Epic Records live albums